Michele Moramarco (Reggio Emilia, 6 October 1953) is an Italian author on Masonic ritual and history, a pop musician, and an advocate of Mazdean Christian Universalism. He leads a group of Italian Oddfellows, who started a revival of the procedures followed by the "Loyal Aristarcus Lodge" (1730-1740), the oldest ascertained Oddfellows' unit.

Works
Publications
 La Massoneria ieri e oggi (De Vecchi, Milan 1977)
 Russian translation: Masonstvo v proshlom i nashtoiashem (Progress, Moscow 1991)
 Per una rifondazione del socialismo, in Marxismo e nonviolenza (Lanterna, Genoa 1977)
 Diario californiano (Bastogi, Foggia 1981)
 Grande Dizionario Enciclopedico UTET (4th ed., Turin 1985) (articles Antroposofia, Besant, Cagliostro, Radiestesia, etc.)
 L'ultima tappa di Henry Corbin, in Contributi alla storia dell'Orientalismo, ed. G.R. Franci (Clueb, Bologna 1985)
 250 anni di Massoneria in Italia (Bastogi, Foggia 1985)
 Nuova Enciclopedia Massonica (Ce.S.A.S., Reggio E. 1989-1995; second ed.: Bastogi, Foggia 1997)
 Psicologia del morire, in I nuovi ultimi (Francisci, Abano Terme 1991)
 Piazza del Gesù (1944-1968). Documenti rari e inediti della tradizione massonica italiana (Ce.SA.S. Reggio Emllia, 1992)
 La celeste dottrina noachita (Ce.S.A.S, Reggio E. 1994)
 I mitici Gufi (Edishow, Reggio Emilia 2001)
 Torbida dea. Psicostoria d'amore, fantomi & zelosia (Bastogi, Foggia 2007)
 Il Mazdeismo Universale. Una chiave esoterica alla dottrina di Zarathushtra (Bastogi, Foggia 2010)
 I Magi eterni. Tra Zarathushtra e Gesù - Una visione mazdeo-cristiana (written with Graziano Moramarco) (Om Edizioni Bolgna 2013)
 La via massonica. Dal manoscritto Graham al risveglio noachide e cristiano (Om Edizioni, Bologna 2014)
Music
 Allucinazioni amorose (meno due) CD (Bastogi Music Italia 2008)
 Masonic Ritual Rhapsody CD (Bastogi Music Italia 2008)
 Gesbitando CD (with Andrea Ascolini) (Bastogi Music Italia 2010)
 Come al crepuscolo l'acacia (Heristal Entertainment, Rome 2013)

References

Sources

Published sources

Web sources

Italian male writers
Italian Freemasons
Living people
1953 births
Christian universalism